The Paris Crash is an electronic rock band based in Sydney, Australia, composed of lead vocalist Darren Crash, guitarist Daniel Crash, bass player Nick Crash, drummer Gareth Crash and keyboardist and backing vocalist Harley Crash.

The band came to prominence in 2010 with the release of their debut single "Honeymoon in Vegas" and subsequent national tour. "Honeymoon in Vegas" debuted at No. 2 in Australia on the ARIA Physical Singles chart and remained in the top fifty for six consecutive weeks, placing at number 48 on the 2010 year-end Physical Singles chart.

Discography

Singles

Music videos
 "Honeymoon in Vegas" – debuted on Australian national television 15 May 2010

References

External links

The Paris Crash Official Facebook

Musical groups established in 2005
New South Wales musical groups